Spring Lake School District is a public school district that serves students in pre-kindergarten through eighth grade in Spring Lake, in Monmouth County, New Jersey, United States.

As of the 2018–19 school year, the district, comprising one school, had an enrollment of 181 students and 27.0 classroom teachers (on an FTE basis), for a student–teacher ratio of 6.7:1. In the 2016–17 school year, Spring Lake had the 43rd smallest enrollment of any school district in the state, with 197 students.

The district is classified by the New Jersey Department of Education as being in District Factor Group "I", the second-highest of eight groupings. District Factor Groups organize districts statewide to allow comparison by common socioeconomic characteristics of the local districts. From lowest socioeconomic status to highest, the categories are A, B, CD, DE, FG, GH, I and J.

Students attending public high school for ninth through twelfth grades are assigned to Manasquan High School as part of a sending/receiving relationship with the Manasquan Public Schools. Manasquan High School also serves students from Avon-by-the-Sea, Belmar, Brielle, Lake Como, Sea Girt and Spring Lake Heights who attend Manasquan High School as part of sending/receiving relationships with their respective districts. As of the 2018–19 school year, the high school had an enrollment of 969 students and 72.9 classroom teachers (on an FTE basis), for a student–teacher ratio of 13.3:1.

Students may also attend one of the magnet schools in the Monmouth County Vocational School District — Marine Academy of Science and Technology, Academy of Allied Health & Science, High Technology High School, Biotechnology High School, and Communications High School.

History
In 1897, the borough's first public school was built at the corner of Warren Avenue and Fifth Avenue. Later, in the 1950s, the building served as a Masonic meeting room, after the school was relocated to Tuttle Avenue. On May 10, 1962, the Spring Lake public school was renamed to honor its retiring principal, H.W. Mountz.

Awards and recognition
In 2015, H.W. Mountz School was one of 15 schools in New Jersey, and one of nine public schools, recognized as a National Blue Ribbon School in the exemplary high performing category by the United States Department of Education.

In 2002, the science teacher for sixth to eighth grade students, John Bormann, received a National Educator Award from the Milken Family Foundation.

On June 5, 2006, Governor of New Jersey Jon Corzine visited H. W. Mountz School to congratulate Katharine Close for winning the Scripps National Spelling Bee.

School
H. W. Mountz Elementary School had an enrollment of 176 students in grades PreK-8 in the 2018–19 school year.
Dr. Stephen La Valva, Principal

Administration
Core members of the school's administration are:
Dr. Stephen LaValva, Superintendent
Joanette Femia, Interim School Business Administrator and Board Secretary

Board of education
The district's board of education, comprised of five elected members, sets policy and oversees the fiscal and educational operation of the district through its administration. As a Type II school district, the board's trustees are elected directly by voters to serve three-year terms of office on a staggered basis, with either one or two seats up for election each year held (since 2012) as part of the November general election. The board appoints a superintendent to oversee the day-to-day operation of the district.

Notable alumni
 Chris Candido (1972–2005), professional wrestler.
 Johnny Candido (born 1982), professional wrestler.

References

External links
H. W. Mountz School

School Data for the H. W. Mountz School, National Center for Education Statistics

Spring Lake, New Jersey
New Jersey District Factor Group I
School districts in Monmouth County, New Jersey
Schools in Monmouth County, New Jersey
Public K–8 schools in New Jersey